Need to Believe is the ninth studio album released by Swiss hard rock band Gotthard. It was released on 4 September 2009 and is the last album with singer Steve Lee before his death.

In an interview, Lee explained, "We want to encourage. Especially in these times that are full of crisis it is important to believe in something. There is a wonderful saying, that 'will can move mountains'. If you are positively thinking and never give up, you will win in the end. That has always been Gotthard's belief".

The album art, as Lee explained, "shows the philosophy of Gotthard: 'Believe in yourself and do your own thing, even if you think it is impossible sometimes.' Like it seems impossible to press water out of a stone. Need To Believe because faith is essential."

A high quality box version was released including a special gimmick and the bonus track "Ain't Enough".

The band contributed one new song to the film Max Schmeling, a biopic by Uwe Boll about boxer Max Schmeling.

The title track, "Need to Believe", was the album's lead single, which was made available for download 14 August 2009.

The album peaked at No. 1 on the Swiss charts and was certified as Platinum for exceeding 30,000 sales.

Track listing

Reception 

The album peaked at No. 1 on the Swiss Charts and stayed for 34 weeks.

Personnel 
Steve Lee – lead vocals
Leo Leoni – guitars
Freddy Scherer – guitars
Marc Lynn – bass
Hena Habegger – drums
Nicolo Fragile – keyboards

Production
Richard Chycki – producer and engineer

Charts

Weekly charts

Year-end charts

References 

2009 albums
Gotthard (band) albums
Nuclear Blast albums